Jesus I Was Evil is an EP by New Zealand musician Darcy Clay.  It was released on Antenna Records in 1997. All songs except for "In The Middle" were recorded on a 4-Track. "Jolene" is a cover of the Dolly Parton song. The title track became Bfm's number one most played song.

Track listing
"Jesus I Was Evil"
"What About It"
"Jolene"
"All I Gotta Do"
"And It Was Easy"
"In The Middle"

Personnel

 All songs executed by Darcy Clay
 All songs written by Clay-Bolton except Jolene by Dolly Parton
 Mixed & Engineered by Darcy Clay & Cameron Fisher
 Mastered by Chris Sinclair

References 

1997 EPs
Darcy Clay albums